Go Tell Somebody, is the second album by American contemporary gospel music group Commissioned, released in 1986 on Light Records.

Domestically, the album peaked at number 2 on the US Billboard Top Gospel albums chart.

Track listing
 "Victory" (4:59)
 "Love Isn't Love" (5:13)
 "Go Tell Somebody" (4:43)
 "Cry On" (5:09)
 "Who Do Men Say I Am" (4:32)
 "Hide The Word" (4:51)
 "Learn To Pray" (4:01)
 "Running Back To You" (4:45)

Personnel
Fred Hammond: vocals, bass guitar, Synclavier, synthesizer 
Keith Staten: vocals
Mitchell Jones: vocals
Karl Reid: vocals
Michael Brooks: keyboards, piano, horn arrangements, synthesizer, Synclavier, Roland synthesizer, WX7 Wind Controller, percussion
Michael Williams: drums, Latin percussion, percussion

Additional musicians
Eric Brice: electric guitar
Earl J. Wright: keyboards, DX7, Moog synthesizer, synthesizer
Michael Wright: electric guitar
Michael J. Powell: classical guitar

References

Commissioned (gospel group) albums
1986 albums